Jean van Silfhout may refer to:

Jean van Silfhout (sportsman) (1902–1956), Dutch rower and swimmer
Jean van Silfhout (rower) (1899–?), Belgian Olympic rower